The year 1941 in television involved some significant events.
Below is a list of television-related events during 1941.

Events
April 30 – In the United States, the Federal Communications Commission (FCC) approves the National Television System Committee (NTSC) standards of 525 lines and 30 frames per second, and authorizes commercial television broadcasting to begin on July 1.
May 2 – In the United States, 10 television stations are granted commercial TV licenses (effective July 1). These stations are required to broadcast 15 hours per week. Bulova Watch Co., Sun Oil Co., Lever Bros. Co. and Procter & Gamble sponsor the first commercial telecasts from WNBT (now WNBC-TV) in New York.
July 1
Commercial television is authorized by the FCC.
NBC television begins commercial operation by its affiliate WNBT New York using channel 1. The world's first legal television commercial advertisement, for Bulova watches, airs at 2:29 PM on WNBT before a baseball game between the Brooklyn Dodgers and Philadelphia Phillies.  An announcement for Bulova watches, for which the company pays anywhere from $4.00 to $9.00 (reports vary), displays a WNBT test pattern modified to look like a clock with the hands showing the time, and the Bulova logo, with the phrase "Bulova Watch Time" shown in the lower right-hand quadrant of the test pattern while the second hand sweeps around the dial for one minute   On July 1, Ray Forrest reads the first formal on-camera TV announcement, followed on July 4 by the first live commercial, for Adam Hats.
 As a one-off special, the first quiz show called "Uncle Bee" is telecast on WNBT's inaugural broadcast day, followed later the same day by Ralph Edwards hosting the second game show broadcast on United States television, Truth or Consequences, as simulcast by radio and TV and sponsored by Ivory soap.  Weekly broadcasts of the show commence during 1956, with Bob Barker.
CBS television begins commercial operation on New York station WCBW (now WCBS-TV) using channel 2.
September 1 — WPTZ (now KYW-TV) signs on in Philadelphia, the third television station in America.
October 21 - Professional wrestling premieres during prime-time on NBC.
December 7 – Ray Forrest of WNBT broadcasts special news bulletin regarding the Pearl Harbor attack, interrupting regular programming, the film Millionaire Playboy.  WNBT later broadcasts special news reports through the evening, pre-empting a scheduled New York Rangers hockey telecast.  WCBW also broadcasts a special that evening, from their Grand Central Terminal studios to the few thousand television set owners in the New York area.

Debuts

July 1 - CBS Television News, debuts on CBS (1941-1943, 1944–Present).
July 1 - Girl About Town with Joan Edwards debuts on CBS (1941-1942).
July 1 - Sports with Bob Edge debuts on CBS (1941-1942).
July 2 - CBS Television Quiz premieres as television's first regular game show (1941–1943). .
July 2 -  Table Talk with Helen Sioussat, the first televised talk show, debuts on CBS (1941-1942).
July 7 - Men At Work, an early variety show, debuts on CBS (1941-1942).
July 8 -  The Boys in the Back Room, a half-hour series that took a behind-the-scenes look at the WCBW television studios, equipment, and staff, debuts on CBS (1941).
July 16 - Stars of Tomorrow debuts on NBC (1941-1942).
July 18 - The Face of the War, an early news show hosted by Sam Cuff, debuts on NBC (1941-1945).
July 18 - Songs by Harvey Harding debuts on NBC (1941-1942).
August 27 - Thrills and Chills Everywhere debuts on NBC (1941-1946).
September 4 - Radio City Matinee debuts on NBC (1941-1942).
September 18 - Fashion Discoveries in Television debuts on NBC (1941).
October 18 - Saturday Night Jamboree debuts on NBC (1941).
October 21 - The Adam Hats Sports Parade: Wrestling at Ridgewood Grove, debuts on NBC (1941–42).
December 19 - America's Town Meeting of the Air, a simulcast of the NBC Blue Network public affairs discussion program, debuts on NBC (1941–42).
December 22 -  War Backgrounds debuts on CBS (1941–42).

Television shows

Programs ending during 1941

Births
January 4 – John Bennett Perry, actor
January 14 – Faye Dunaway, actress
January 24 – Neil Diamond, actor
January 30 – Dick Cheney, politician
January 31 – Jessica Walter, actress (died 2021)
February 1 – Joy Philbin, television personality
February 3 – Bridget Hanley, actress
February 5 
David Selby, actor
Stephen J. Cannell, producer (died 2010)
February 8 – Nick Nolte, actor
February 10 
Michael Apted, actor (died 2021)
Dick Carlson, journalist
February 12 – Chas. Floyd Johnson, actor
February 13 – David Jeremiah, pastor
February 27 – Charlotte Stewart, actress
March 4 – Richard Benjamin Harrison, television personality (died 2018)
March 5 – Sam Nover, television sportscaster (died 2018)
March 7 – Joanna Frank, television actress
March 8 – Adrienne Ellis, actress
March 9 – Trish Van Devere, actress
March 16 – Chuck Woolery, game show host
March 20 – Paul Junger Witt, producer
March 28 – Alf Clausen, composer
April 3 – Eric Braeden, German-born actor
April 5 – Michael Moriarty, American-Canadian actor
April 7 – Cornelia Frances, actress (died 2018)
April 20 – Ryan O'Neal, actor
April 28 – Ann-Margret, Swedish-born actress, dancer and singer
May 4 – George Will, American libertarian-conservative political commentator
May 13 – Senta Berger, Austrian actress and producer
May 17 – Grace Zabriskie, actress
May 18 – Miriam Margolyes, actress
May 29 – Bob Simon, American television correspondent (died 2015)
June 2 – Stacy Keach, actor
June 12 – Marv Albert, American sportscaster
June 13 – Paul Moyer, American journalist
June 17 – William Lucking, American actor (died 2021)
June 21 
Joe Flaherty, Canadian-American actor and comedian
Lyman Ward, Canadian actor
June 22 
Michael Lerner, actor
Barry Serafin, television journalist
July 3 – Gloria Allred, attorney
July 8 – Michael K. Frith, producer
July 10 – Robert Pine, actor
July 13 – Robert Forster, actor (died 2019)
July 22 – George Clinton, funk musician
July 28 – Peter Cullen, voice actor
July 29 – David Warner, actor (died 2022)
July 30 – Rod Perry, actor (died 2020)
August 3 – Martha Stewart, writer
August 4 – Paul Mooney, comedian, writer and actor (died 2021)
August 27 – Harrison Page, actor
September 6 – Edgar Snyder, Pittsburgh-area personal injury lawyer who appeared in commercials
September 17 – Gary DeVore, screenwriter (died 1997)
September 18 – Gerry Bamman, actor
October 4 – Lori Saunders, actress
October 5 – Stephanie Cole, actress
October 7 – John Ford Noonan, actor (died 2018)
October 10 – Peter Coyote, actor
October 16 – Tim McCarver, baseball player and sportscaster (died 2023)
October 31 – Sally Kirkland, actress
November 1 – Robert Foxworth, actor
November 5 – Tony Guida, radio personality
November 18 – Ron Powers, American journalist
November 21 
Juliet Mills, actress
David Porter, musician
Dr. John, singer
November 23 – Franco Nero, actor
December 4 – David Johnston, Australian newsreader
December 6 
Leon Russom, actor
Rolland Smith, news anchor
December 9 
 Beau Bridges, actor
 César Mascetti, Argentine television host (died 2022)
December 10 – Fionnula Flanagan, actress
December 13 – John Davidson, actor, singer and game show host
December 16 – Lesley Stahl, television journalist

References 

 
TV